Grodzisk may refer to any of the following places:

Grodzisk, Greater Poland Voivodeship (west-central Poland)
Grodzisk, Łódź Voivodeship (central Poland)
Grodzisk, Lubusz Voivodeship (west Poland)
Grodzisk, Mińsk County, Masovian Voivodeship (east-central Poland)
Grodzisk, Ostrołęka County, Masovian Voivodeship (east-central Poland)
Grodzisk, Siedlce County, Masovian Voivodeship (east-central Poland)
Grodzisk, Sokołów County, Masovian Voivodeship (east-central Poland)
Grodzisk, Węgrów County, Masovian Voivodeship (east-central Poland)
Grodzisk, Hajnówka County, Podlaskie Voivodeship (north-east Poland)
Grodzisk, Siemiatycze County, Podlaskie Voivodeship (north-east Poland)
Grodzisk, Sokółka County, Podlaskie Voivodeship (north-east Poland)
Grodzisk Mazowiecki, Masovian Voivodeship (east-central Poland)
Grodzisk Wielkopolski, Greater Poland Voivodeship (west-central Poland)

See also
Dyskobolia Grodzisk Wielkopolski, a football club
Grodzhisk, Hasidic dynasty
Grodzisk Goblins, a fictional sports club in the Harry Potter universe
Grodziskie, a beer style
Grodzisko (disambiguation)